Star Wars Galaxy's Edge: Black Spire is a 2019 novel written by Delilah S. Dawson and published by Del Rey Books. The novel is a sequel to the 2018 novel Phasma, also by Dawson. It takes place in the Star Wars galaxy, immediately after the events of Star Wars Episode VIII: The Last Jedi.

Plot summary
Vi Moradi, the main protagonist, is tasked with setting up a base for the Resistance by General Leia Organa. She travels to the fictional planet Batuu, which is also the site of Disney's Star Wars theme park attraction. She is aided by Archex, a former First Order stormtrooper. Together, they recruit locals and build a small resistance camp to fight the nearby First Order presence that has been alerted to Vi and Archex's presence.

Reception
The book met mixed reviews from multiple critics, some praised the book while others didn't especially enjoy it.
Megan Crouse of Den of Geek wrote "Star Wars Galaxy’s Edge tie-in novel Black Spire is about good people, but, unfortunately, isn’t a very good novel. "
Brian Silliman from SyfyWire.com wrote: It's one of the first real glimpses we've gotten into what happened after [The Last Jedi] and it is a highly interesting read. 
Meg Dowell from the website DorkSideoftheForce.com wrote "...Delilah S. Dawson has told an unforgettable story that has a major impact on the future of the Skywalker saga ... definitely add this book to your list. "

References

2019 American novels
Novels based on Star Wars
Delilah S. Dawson works
Del Rey books